Coert Frederick Cronjé (born 11 May 1988 in Vereeniging, South Africa) is a South African rugby union player for the  in the Currie Cup. His regular position is outside centre, but he can also play at inside centre or on the wing.

Career

Youth rugby

He went to Kempton Park secondary school Jeugland Hoërskool and was selected in the ' squad for the 2006 Under-18 Craven Week competition held in Pretoria.

In 2007, he made the very short journey to Johannesburg to join the  academy. He played for the  side during the 2007 Under-19 Provincial Championship and for the  side during the Under-21 Provincial Championships in 2008 and 2009.

Falcons

His first season proved to be a very memorable one; not only did he start all ten of the  matches during the competition, but he also scored nine tries during the competition, to finish as the joint-top try scorer.

With those performances firmly establishing Cronjé as a first-choice player for the Falcons, he quickly racked up appearances and passed the half-century mark during the 2013 Currie Cup First Division season. His try-scoring exploits continued, although not as prolific as his first season. In 2011, he scored eight tries in seventeen appearances and scored three tries in eight starts in 2012. Five tries followed in twenty starts in 2013 and he got two tries during the 2014 Vodacom Cup competition.

References

South African rugby union players
Living people
1988 births
People from Vereeniging
Falcons (rugby union) players
Rugby union centres
Rugby union wings
Sportspeople from Gauteng